Now is the Hour is a mockumentary television series starring New Zealand singer Deane Waretini who had a #1 hit with The Bridge in 1981.

Synopsis
In the series, Dean Waretini is a 65 year old taxi driver. The seven part comedy series, which is about Waretini, is a blurring of fact and fiction. Besides Waretini, it also features Orlando, the manager from Wayne Anderson - Singer of Songs, and a former Russian nuclear physicist. In a short review of the show, Paul Casserly of The New Zealand Herald said that sometimes it was hard to tell what was fact and what was fiction. It has a "road trip" theme to it. Along for the ride is Raewyn-Anne who is the founder of his fan club of 16 strong. The series follows Waretini as he moves around from Christchurch to where he started off in Rotorua with him hoping to re start his career with Orlando Stewart organizing his venues.  Frolov has a job to get Waretini info physical shape while Waretini tries to teach him his song. One of the episodes features Deane and Andrei recording a song.

Production and other info
The story was penned by New Zealand writer and comedian Orlando Stewart.
The show consists of 7 episodes running at 26 minutes each. It made its debut on Maori Television on 10.00pm on Friday, August 31, 2012.

Andrei Frolov is a member of the Russian Cultural Centre Trust in Christchurch.

Cast and crew

Cast
 Deane Waretini
 Andrei Frolov 
 Orlando Stewart

Crew
 Meg Douglas - Executive producer

Episodes

References

External links
 Interview: Talking Heads: Deane Waretini and Orlando Stewart
 Imdb: Deane Waretini: Now Is the Hour
 Official Facebook site

2010s New Zealand television series
2012 New Zealand television series debuts
2012 New Zealand television series endings
Māori Television original programming
New Zealand mockumentary television series
New Zealand music television series
Television shows set in New Zealand